Jason Hasford (born 1 April 1971) is an English former professional footballer who played for Manchester City 1987-89 playing in the youth cup final 1989. The following season, he spent at Rochdale FC making one first team appearance.

After  being  released  he  spent  1990–91  in  the  States  with  Wichita Wings  for  whom  he  played  35  games  scoring  3  goals. The  following  season  he  played  for  Mossley  in  midfield  scoring  twice  in  10  games. He  is  now  a  film-maker  and  director  of  JMG  Media. JMG Media won the virgin media shorts 'people's choice' award with their film 'Bus Baby' in 2010

References

Living people
1971 births
Footballers from Manchester
Manchester City F.C. players
Rochdale A.F.C. players
Wichita Wings players
Association football forwards
English footballers